Zittard may refer to:
 Zittard, a hamlet in Limburg, Netherlands
 Zittard, a hamlet in North Brabant, Netherlands